William Erwood Otway (23 April 1794 – 1862) was an English first-class cricketer who is recorded in two matches from 1824 to 1825, in both cases representing the Gentlemen against the Players, totalling 4 runs with a highest score of 3 and holding 2 catches. His brother was John Otway.

References

Bibliography
 

English cricketers
English cricketers of 1787 to 1825
Gentlemen cricketers
1794 births
1862 deaths
People from East Hertfordshire District